is a former Japanese football player.

Playing career
Matsushita was born in Iwata on October 31, 1981. He joined J1 League club Júbilo Iwata from youth team in 2000. However he could not play at all in the match behind Yushi Ozaki and Arno van Zwam. In April 2001, he moved to Shizuoka Sangyo University which joined Japan Football League and played many matches as regular goalkeeper. In October 2001, he returned to Júbilo Iwata. However he could not play at all in the match. In 2004, he moved to J2 League club Ventforet Kofu. He played several matches in 2004 and 2005 and the club was promoted to J1 from 2006. However he could not play at all in the match in 2006 and retired end of 2006 season. In July 2010, when he coached at Ventforet Kofu, he returned as a player because regular goalkeeper Kota Ogi got injured. However he could not play at all in the match and his registration was deleted in October.

Club statistics

References

External links

1981 births
Living people
Shizuoka Sangyo University alumni
Association football people from Shizuoka Prefecture
Japanese footballers
J1 League players
J2 League players
Júbilo Iwata players
Ventforet Kofu players
Association football goalkeepers